Do Bol previously titled Aseer e Mohabbat is a 2019 Pakistani romantic drama television series that premiered on ARY Digital from 5 March 2019 to 5 May 2019. It is directed by Syed Wajahat Hussain and written by Sarwat Nazir. Produced by Humayun Saeed and Shahzad Nasib under Six Sigma Plus in collaboration with Next Level Entertainment, it stars Hira Mani and Affan Waheed.

Plot 
This serial depicts a complicated yet a very beautiful love story between two persons who belong to entirely different family backgrounds. Geeti (Hira Salman), a carefree and cheerful girl, belongs to a wealthy family. While, Badar (Affan Waheed), a mature guy, has a middle class family background. He works at Geeti's home as his father's manager where he secretly falls in love with her. Whereas, Geeti is interested in her childhood's friend Sameer (Haroon Shahid). Due to some unfavourable situations and misunderstandings, Geeti is forced into marriage with Badar. Apparently, it was in favour of Badar but Geeti was extremely unhappy with this marriage. Despite Geeti's ignorance, Badar stands by her in all difficulties and keeps loving her more and more. The twists of circumstances eventually turns this forced marriage into a successful one and brings together the hearts of two.

Cast 
Affan Waheed as Badar uz Zaman
Hira Mani as Gaiti Ara
Haroon Shahid as Sameer
Mehmood Aslam as Iqbal Hussain; Gaiti’s father
Zainab Qayyum as Nafisa; Iqbal's 2nd wife, Gaiti's step-mother
Samina Ahmed as Firdous; Iqbal's sister, Gaiti's aunt
Seemi Pasha as Jahan Ara; Gaiti's mother 
Shehryar Zaidi as Nafees; Jahan Ara's husband, Gaiti's step father
Anam Tanveer as Fareeha; Iqbal's younger sister, Gaiti’s aunt, Hasaan's wife
Rubina Ashraf as Qudsia; Badar's mother
Shehzad Mukhtar as Badar's father
Emmad Butt as Hasaan; Sameer’s elder brother, Fareeha's husband
Haris Waheed as Zafar; Firdous's son
Akhtar Hasnain as Munawwar; Iqbal's younger brother, Gaiti's Uncle
Salma Hassan as Nasreen; Munawwar's wife
Mariam Mirza as Safeena; mother of Sameer and Hasaan
Vasiya Fatima as Neelam, Gaiti's cousin, Munawwar and Nasreen's daughter
Usman Mazhar as Lateef; Badar's childhood friend
Salman Saeed as Jamshed; Badar's cousin
Ifra Khalid as Rania; Badar's elder sister
Laiba Khan as Rafia; Badar's younger sister
Shaharyar Irfan as Khalid; Sameer's friend

Release
The show originally started out airing on Tuesday nights where it aired 2 episodes in one week (as a double episode entertainment), then was extended to Wednesday nights where it aired 4 episodes in one week with two each day (as a double episode), and then finally aired on Monday, Tuesday, Wednesday and Sunday night in its last week with the last 8 episodes airing with two each day (as a double episode). The show was extended due to Ramadan being near and ARY Digital runs transmissions and game shows throughout the day, leaving space for barely any dramas in the week. The drama serial garnered immense popularity worldwide with being trending on YouTube in  Pakistan and also other countries.

Soundtrack

The title song is Ja Tujhe Maaf Kiya  by Nabeel Shaukat Ali and Aima Baig. The music was composed by Harris Shahryar and the lyrics were written by Naveed Naushad & Imran Raza.
It has garnered more than 77 million views since uploaded in YouTube on 4 March 2019 as of 24 August 2021.

Awards and nominations

References

External links
Do Bol on ARY Digital

Pakistani drama television series
Urdu-language television shows
ARY Digital original programming
2019 Pakistani television series debuts